Acorralados (English: Corralled) is the third Spanish season of The Farm. This season aired on Telecinco after the two first seasons were aired on Antena 3 under the name La Granja, being the actual format its spin-off. The season began on 15 September 2011, taking over from Supervivientes 2011. Magnolia TV España bought the format from Strix. The hosts were Jorge Javier Vázquez, at the central studio in Madrid, and Raquel Sánchez Silva, from the farm. The Farm was located in a 30 inhabitants mountain village named Lodeña, in Asturias.

Acorralados (2011)

Contestants

Nominations

 Farmhouse Leader
 Immune

Nominations and eviction notes

 Note 1: At the first round of nominations, the male contestants were immune. Mª Ángeles was also immune as she was who lost the duel against Bárbara. There was a tie between Regina and Brenda and Bárbara broke the tie and chose Brenda as first nominee. Brenda was nominated by the female contestants, Regina was nominated by the male contestants and Blanca was nominated by the FarmHouse leader.
 Note 2: At the second round of nominations, the male contestants were immune. Mª Ángeles was also immune as she was who lost the duel against Sonia. There was a tie between Bárbara and Blanca and Sonia broke the tie and chose Blanca as first nominee. Blanca was nominated by the female contestants, Bárbara was nominated by the male contestants and Nagore was nominated by the FarmHouse leader.
 Note 3: At the third round of nominations, the male contestants were immune. Brenda was also immune as she lost the duel against Nagore. Blanca was nominated by the female contestants, Sonia was nominated by the male contestants, and Mª Ángeles was nominated by the FarmHouse leader.
 Note 4: At the fourth round of nominations, Leticia was immune as she was who lost the duel against Antonio David.
 Note 5: Four new contestants arrive to the farm: Liberto, Álvaro, Raquel and Úrsula. At the fifth round of nominations, Mª Ángeles was immune as she lost the duel against Blanca. Dioni was nominated by the farm leader, Antonio David and Nagore by the main contestants. The new contestants nominated Leticia between the three contestants not nominated Leticia, Raúl and Reche.
 Note 6: The sixth round of nominations was to save. As Antonio David and Mª Ángeles did not receive any vote to save, the farm leader, Reche, had to choose the first nominee between them. The four new contestants voted to evict Raúl; he was the second nominee. Finally Reche nominated Nagore as third nominee.
 Note 7: Liberto had 1 extra point as he told information from outside world. Reche was immune as he was who lost the duel against Álvaro.
 Note 8: On day 50, a public vote among Leticia, Regina and Sonia was open to re-enter into the show. Regina won the vote and she was immune that round. Raquel, Liberto and Blanca had one extra point for talking about the outside world. Reche was immune as he was who lost the duel against Álvaro
 Note 9: Reche was automatically nominated because he broke the rules. Dioni was immune as he was who lost the duel against Álvaro.
 Note 10: Dioni was ejected because he suffered health issues and was suggested to leave the show.
 Note 11: To replace Dioni, a public vote was open to choose between Antonio David, Mª Ángeles and Raúl. With 54% of the votes, Mª Ángeles was chosen to re-enter. She entered on day 67.
 Note 12: Regina was immune as she was who failed the duel against Nagore. Nagore had to break the tie between Álvaro, Liberto and Úrsula, she saved Úrsula but later as farmleader she nominated her.
 Note 13: Mª Ángeles was automatically nominated as she revealed information from the outside world. Since this round, the person who loses the duel is not immune anymore.
 Note 14: There was a tie between Liberto and Raquel with 2 votes. Nagore, as farmleader, had to break the tie and she chose Liberto as the first nominee. Then she nominated Regina as the second one.
 Note 15: The three contestants competed in a challenge and Blanca finished in last place so she was the first nominee. The ex-contestants nominated to choose the second nominee; they chose Nagore. Raquel became the first finalist.

Pesadilla en El Paraíso (2022)

Contestants

Nominations

Pesadilla en El Paraíso 2 (2023)

Contestants

Nominations

References

External links
Official site

Television series by Endemol
The Farm (franchise)
Spanish reality television series